Javier Delgado Prado (born 28 July 1968) is a Costa Rican former professional football player and coach.

Club career
Delgado spent the majority of his career at hometown club Alajuelense, but had a spell abroad at Guatemalan side Municipal and a season at Santa Bárbara.

International career
Delgado made 33 appearances for the Costa Rica national football team, including qualifying matches for the 1998 FIFA World Cup.

Managerial career
He started his managerial career with his beloved Liga in 2003, but they released him in February 2006 citing insufficient results. In December 2006, Delgado took the reins at Herediano but was sacked by them in March 2008. Delgado then took charge of Puntarenas in May 2008, four weeks after leaving Herediano, but left the club in October 2008 citing personal reasons. He joined Ramonense in September 2009 and later moved abroad to his former club Municipal, who dismissed him in September 2012.

In November 2012 he was appointed by Cartaginés, leaving them in March 2013 and in August 2014, Delgado replaced Hernán Medford as manager of Honduran side Real España.

References

External links
 

1968 births
Living people
People from Alajuela
Association football defenders
Costa Rican men's footballers
Costa Rica international footballers
1993 CONCACAF Gold Cup players
1997 Copa América players
Copa Centroamericana-winning players
L.D. Alajuelense footballers
C.S.D. Municipal players
Expatriate footballers in Guatemala
Costa Rican football managers
L.D. Alajuelense managers
C.S. Herediano managers
Puntarenas F.C. managers
C.S.D. Municipal managers
Real C.D. España managers
Expatriate football managers in Guatemala
Expatriate football managers in Honduras
Liga FPD players